XL Recordings Chapters was a musical compilation series which showcased tracks from the XL Recordings record label. Also, other notable breakbeat hardcore, house and techno tracks, XL's output at the time, were featured from other labels. 

XL released these compilations between 1990 and 1995. The label released, "Chapter VI" in November 2015 showcasing the latest crop of artists with XL Recordings.

XL acts on the chapters series included :

 Empirion
 Jonny L
 Liquid
 Nu-Matic
 The Prodigy
 SL2

Other non-XL acts included :

 Brooklyn Funk Essentials
 The House Crew
 Kicks Like a Mule
 Praga Khan
 Project One
 Shut Up and Dance
 Underworld
 Winx

The Chapters

 The First Chapter – 1990
1. Flowmasters  – Let It Take Control
2. 2 In Rhythm – We Want Funk 
3. Brooklyn Funk Essentials – We Got To Come Together  
4. Looney Tunes – Just As Long As I Got You –
5. Centrefield Assignment – Mi Casa 
6. Ellis D – I Will Survive 
7. Subliminal Aura – Ease The Pressure 
8. Moody Boyz – Jammin' 
9. Hardcore – I Like John
10. Space Opera – Space 3001 
11. Fantasy UFO – Fantasy  
12. Liaison D – He Chilled Out 
13. Looney Tunes – Inject The Beat 
14. Freedom Authority – Expressions

 The Second Chapter – Hardcore European Dance Music – 1991
1. T99 – Anasthasia (The Scientist remix) 
2. Channel X – Rave The Rhythm 
3. Holy Noise – The Noise 
4. John and Julie – Circles (G.T.O's Europa mix) 
5. Set Up System – Fairy Dust 
6. External Group – Gravity  
7. Cubic 22 – Night In Motion 
8. Digital Boy – Gimme A Fat Beat (Frank de Wulf remix) 
9. Frequency – Where Is Your Evidence 
10.The Prodigy – Charly  
11. Incubus – The Spirit 
12.Praga Khan – Rave Alarm 
 
 
 The Third Chapter – Breakbeat House – 1992
1. Liquid – Sweet Harmony
2. Shut Up And Dance – The Green Man (Rum and Black Mix)
3. Tronik House – Uptempo (Reese Mix)
4. SL2 – On a Ragga Tip
5. Project One – Smokin
6. The House Crew – Keep The Fires Burning
7. The Prodigy – Everybody In The Place (Fairground Mix)
8. Nu-Matic – Hard Times
9. First Project – Right Before
10. Kicks Like a Mule – "The Bouncer" (Housequake Mix)
11. SL2 – DJs Take Control (DJ Seduction Remix)
12. Mark One – Hoovers and Spraycans

 4th Chapter – 1993
1. Underworld – Rez                       
2. Illuminate (XVX.1) – Tremona Del Terra 
3. Jonny L – Ooh Like It (Original Sin Edit)
4. Liquid – Free                          
5. Me And Jack – Viva House               
6. Delta Lady – Anything You Want       
7. The Prodigy – One Love (Original Mix)  
8. Sourmash – Pilgrimage To Paradise     
9. Jonny L – Transonic                  
10. The Prodigy – Weather Experience       
11. Wiggle – Africa                        
12. Dome Patrol – The Cutting Edge

 5th Chapter – The Heavyweight Selection – 1995
1 Liquid – Niagara 
2 Winx – Don't Laugh (Josh Wink Raw Mix)
3 Tall Paul – Rok Da House 
4 Subliminal Cuts – Le Voie Le Soleil (Way Out West Summer Of Love Remix) 
5 Head-On – I Want Your Love (JX Mix) 
6 Yum Yum – 3 Minute Warning (Scope Mix) 
7 Movin' Melodies – La Luna (To The Beat Of The Drum) 
8 Pleasant Chemistry – (Let's Have Some) Sax (Sax Or Snares Mix) 
9 The Prodigy – The Speedway (Theme From Fastlane) (Secret Knowledge Trouser Rouser) 
10 Empirion – Narcotic Influence

 Remix Chapter – Hardcore European Music – 1992 (Japan AVEX Trax )
1. T99 – Anasthasia (The Scientist remix) 
2. The Prodigy – Charly
3. SL2 – On A Ragga Tip
4. Praga Khan – Rave Alarm
5. Cubic 22 – Night In Motion
6. SL2 – DJ'S Take Control
7. The Prodigy – Fire (Sunrise Version)
8. Liquid – Sweet Harmony
9. Nu Matic – Spring In My Step
10. Liquid – Liquid Is Liquid
11. DJ's Unite – DJ's Unite
12. The Prodigy – Everybody In The Place

 The American Chapter 1993
1. Looney Tunes – Just as Long as I Got You – Looney Tunes  
2. Flowmasters – Let It Take Control  
3. John and Julie – Circles 
4. Awesome 3 – Don't Go 
5. Liquid – Sweet Harmony 
6. The Prodigy – Charly
7. Cubic 22 – Night in Motion
8. T99 – Anasthasia 
9. Dub War – Dance Conspiracy 
10. Dome Patrol   – Cutting Edge  
11. SL2 – On a Ragga Tip
12. Jonny L – Ooh, I Like It

 Chapter VI 2015
1. Special Request – Amnesia
2. Novelist x Mumdance – 1 Sec
3. rLr – I Am Paint (Centre Of The Earth Dub)
4. Zomby – Slime
5. GILA – Handz On A Hardbody
6. MssingNo – Inta
7. KAYTRANADA – 195
8. Homepark – Forever Walking
9. Hugo Massien – All Night
10. Powell – Insomniac

References

External links
 XL Recordings First Chapter – Hardcore Music Alley
 XL Recordingds Chapter VI – XL Recordings

Compilation album series